Holyport College is a mixed boarding free school (the boarding option for students is not free). The school is located in Holyport, Berkshire, England. It opened in 2014 and caters for students aged 11–19 years. It is sponsored by Eton College, which also shares some of its sporting facilities with Holyport. Holyport College has two pygmy goats which are named Toni and Simon after the two Headmasters of Eton College who have supported the school since it opened.

Holyport College’s Founding Head Master, Mr Boyle, can often be found serenading the school community in his regular “Boyle’s Bits” segment on the College’s daily Vlog.

References

External links 
 Holyport College official site

Secondary schools in the Royal Borough of Windsor and Maidenhead
Educational institutions established in 2014
2014 establishments in England
Free schools in England
Boarding schools in Berkshire
Eton College